Lebedodes violascens is a moth in the family Cossidae. It is found in Tanzania.

References

Natural History Museum Lepidoptera generic names catalog

Endemic fauna of Tanzania
Metarbelinae
Moths described in 1929